is a 1991 platform arcade video game developed by Data East first published in Japan by Namco, then in North America by Leprechaun Inc. and later in Europe by Mitchell Corporation. Starring two ghosthunters, players are tasked with travelling across different countries, capturing enemies and throwing them as bouncing ball, jumping on and off platforms to navigate level obstacles while dodging and defeating monsters in order to save the world.

Designed by Makoto Kikuchi, Tumblepop was developed by most of the same team that worked on several projects at Data East. Although first launched in arcades, the game was later ported across multiple platforms, each one featuring several changes or additions compared with the original version. The title was met with mostly positive reception from critics and players alike, gaining a cult following since its initial release. However, other versions were met with a more mixed response from reviewers.

Gameplay 

Tumblepop is a platform game reminiscent of Bubble Bobble, Pang and Snow Bros., where players assume the role of ghosthunters through ten levels consisting of ten stages set in different parts of the world (Moscow, Egypt, Paris, New York City, Rio de Janeiro, Antarctica, Australia, Japan, Space and Moon), each with a boss at the every tenth stage that must be fought before progressing any further, in an effort to defeat monsters, ghosts, aliens and other oddball characters as the main objective. Each player can suck enemies into a vacuum-cleaner-like devices, however enemies will escape from the player's vacuum-cleaner and kill their character if they are kept for too long. Once an enemy has been captured into the vacuum-cleaner, players can spit them back as rolling balls, which will rebound off of walls until eventually shattering against a wall.

Any enemies the tumbling ball rolls into are eliminated and reveal hidden bonus items that are crucial for reaching high-scores such as collectable letters of the alphabet found in randomly appearing bubbles to gradually spell the word "TUMBLEPOP", the progress of which is permanently displayed at the bottom of the screen. The word goes back to default after completion. When completed, players are transported to a bonus level which gives them the opportunity to obtain higher scores and an extra life, although this level is strictly timed. If the player takes too much time to complete a level, a vampire-like beast will come and try to kill the players, which is invincible and this also counts during boss encounters.

When players bowl an enemy over, it may drop other items like gems, money or power-ups. Players can also stun enemies with the beam emitted from the vacuum-cleaner. The game hosts cameos of characters from other Data East games such as Karnov, Atomic Runner Chelnov and Joe & Mac. If a single player is downed, their character is immediately respawned at the location they start at on every stage. Getting hit by enemy fire will result in losing a life, as well as a penalty of decreasing the characters' firepower and speed to his original state and once all lives are lost, the game is over unless the players insert more credits into the arcade machine to continue playing.

Development and release 
Tumblepop was developed by most of the same team that worked on several projects at Data East, with Makoto Kikuchi serving as its designer. Hidemi Hamada, Kei Ichikawa and Minoru Sano acted as programmers, while several artists like Atsushi Takahashi, Chie Kitahara, Hiroshi Tada and others were responsible for the pixel art. The soundtrack was handled by Gamadelic members Mihoko Ando, Tatsuya Kiuchi and Tomoyoshi Sato.

Tumblepop was first released in November 1991 in Japan by Namco, Leprechaun Inc. in North America and Mitchell Corporation in Europe. In 1992, a Game Boy version was first released in Japan by Data East and later in North America by Sunsoft in March 1993. The Game Boy version incorporates a world map that does not resemble Earth; levels are contained in different cities on that map that the player can walk between. If a city proves too difficult, it is also possible to drop out of it and come back later via a password system. Enemies in a given city approximately correspond to those in an area in the arcade version, though there is not necessarily any link between the real world's cities and the game's cities. In addition, this version also incorporates a shop in which players can spend their points to buy power-ups. It has since been re-released on both the Nintendo 3DS' Virtual Console by G-Mode and the AntStream service.

Reception 

In Japan, Game Machine listed Tumblepop on their 1 December 1991 issue as being the eighth most-successful table arcade unit of the month. In the February 1992 issue of Japanese publication Micom BASIC Magazine, the game was ranked on the number eight spot in popularity. The arcade original has gained a cult following since its release.

Computer and Video Gamess Julian Rignall gave high praise to the visuals, sound and "addictive" gameplay. Both Emmanuel Castro and Burno Sol of Spanish website Vandal gave it a positive retrospective outlook. Likewise, Juan Garcia of IGN Spain also gave it a positive retrospective outlook.

Notes

References

External links 
 Tumblepop at GameFAQs
 Tumblepop at Giant Bomb
 Tumblepop at Killer List of Videogames
 Tumblepop at MobyGames
 Tumblepop (Game Boy) at MobyGames

1991 video games
Arcade video games
Cooperative video games
Data East arcade games
Data East video games
Game Boy games
Marvelous Entertainment franchises
Platform games
Video games developed in Japan
Video games set in Antarctica
Video games set in Australia
Video games set in Brazil
Video games set in Egypt
Video games set in Japan
Video games set in Moscow
Video games set in New York City
Video games set in Paris
Video games set on the Moon
Virtual Console games
Multiplayer and single-player video games